John Holland Rose (28 June 1855 – 3 March 1942) was an influential English historian who wrote famous biographies of William Pitt the Younger and of French emperor Napoleon Bonaparte. He also wrote a history of Europe, entitled The Development of the European Nations among other historical works. He was Vere Harmsworth Professor of Imperial and Naval History at the University of Cambridge between 1919 and his retirement in 1934.

Career
Holland Rose was born in Bedford in 1855. He was educated at Bedford Modern School where he was an exhibitioner, at Owens College, Manchester, and at Christ's College, Cambridge.

In 1911–1919, Holland Rose was a reader in modern history at the University of Cambridge. He was the first Vere Harmsworth Professor of Naval History at the University of Cambridge between 1919 and his retirement in 1933. He was an honorary member of the Polish Academy of Arts and Sciences.

Holland Rose was the basis for C. P. Snow's fictional character M. H. L. Gay (see "Years of Hope: Cambridge, Colonial Administrator in the South Seas, and Cricket" by Philip Snow).

Family life
In 1880, Holland Rose married Laura K. Haddon; they had one son and two daughters.

He died on 3 March 1942.

Selected works 

 A Century of Continental History, 1780–1880 (London: E. Stanford, 1891; 2nd ed. 1906)  read online
 The Revolutionary and Napoleonic Era, 1789–1815 (Cambridge University Press, 1894, 1904, 1919, 1925) read online
 The Rise of Democracy (London: Blackie and Son, 1897, 1904, 1912) read online
 The Rise and Growth of Democracy in Great Britain (Chicago: Stone, 1898) read online
 The Life of Napoleon I (2 vols.) (1902;<ref>{{cite journal|title=Review of "The Life of Napoleon I by John Holland Rose|journal=Saturday Review of Politics, Literature, Science and Art|date=10 May 1902|volume=93|issue=2428|pages=602–603|url=https://babel.hathitrust.org/cgi/pt?id=iau.31858016628285;view=1up;seq=612}}</ref> 11th ed. 1935) read online
 The French Revolution: A History, by Thomas Carlyle (ed.) (London: G. Bell, 1902) read online
 Napoleonic Studies (London: G. Bell, 1904, 1914) read online
 Select Despatches from the British Foreign Office Archives, Relating to the Formation of the Third Coalition Against France, 1804–1805 (London: Royal Historical Society, 1904) read online
  read online
 Dumouriez and the Defence of England Against Napoleon (with Alexander Meyrick Broadley) (London: J. Lane, 1908) read online
 A History of Malta During the Period of the French and British Occupations, 1798–1815 (by William Hardman) (ed. John Holland Rose) (London: Longman, Green and Company, 1909) read online
 William Pitt and National Revival (London: G. Bell and Sons, 1911) read online
 William Pitt and the Great War (London: G. Bell and Sons, 1911) read online
 The Personality of Napoleon: The Lowell Lectures for 1912 (New York: G.P. Putnam's Sons, 1912, 1930) read online
 Pitt and Napoleon: Essays and Letters (London: C. Belland Sons, Ltd., 1912) read online
 How the War Came About. London: The Patriotic Publishing Co., 1914
 The Origins of War: Lectures Delivered in the Michaelmas Term, 1914 (Cambridge University Press, 1914) read online
 The Origins of the War, 1871–1914 (New York: G.P. Putnam's Sons, 1915) read online
 Germany in the Nineteenth Century: Five Lectures by J. H. Rose, C. H. Herford, E. C. K. Gonner, and M. E. Sadler, with an introductory note by Viscount Haldane, ed. C.H. Herford (Manchester: Manchester University Press, 1915)  read online
 Nationality as a Factor in Modern History (London: Rivingtons, 1916) read online
 Nationality in Modern History (New York: Macmillan and Company, 1916) read online
 Why We Carry On (London: T.F. Unwin, 1918) read online
 Naval History and National History: The Inaugural Lecture Delivered to the University of Cambridge on Trafalgar Day, 1919 (Cambridge University Press, 1919) read online
 Lord Hood and the Defence of Toulon (University of Cambridge Press, 1922) read online
 The Indecisiveness of Modern War, and Other Essays (Kennikat Press, 1927) read online
 Contributor to The Thinkers of the Revolutionary Era (1930)
 The Mediterranean in the Ancient World (Cambridge University Press, 1933) read online
 Man and the Sea: Stages in Maritime and Human Progress (W. Hoffer and Sons, 1935) read online
 Co-editor of and contributor to The Cambridge History of the British Empire Chapters in The Cambridge Modern History (vols. viii and ix), and The Cambridge History of British Foreign Policy;; (vol. i)
 Articles in English Historical Review, Edinburgh, Nineteenth Century and After, Contemporary Review, Cambridge Historical Journal, et al.

References

External links
 
 

1855 births
1942 deaths
20th-century English historians
Historians of the Napoleonic Wars
Vere Harmsworth Professors of Imperial and Naval History
Alumni of Christ's College, Cambridge
People educated at Bedford Modern School